Payback may refer to:

 Revenge, a harmful action against a person or group in response to a grievance

Payback may also refer to:

Art, entertainment, and media

Fictional entities
 Payback, a member of the fictional comics superhero team Shadow Cabinet by DC Comics
 Payback, a fictional character in the Marvel Comics series True Believers

Film 
 Payback (1991 film), a film starring Michael Ironside
 Payback (1995 film), a thriller starring C. Thomas Howell
 Payback (1997 film), a television film starring Mary Tyler Moore
 Payback (1999 film), a film starring Mel Gibson; a remake of the 1967 film Point Blank starring Lee Marvin
 Payback (2010 film), an Indian Hindi thriller film
 Payback (2012 film), a Canadian documentary film

Literature 
 "Payback: A Strandville Prequel Short (Max Reid's Story)" (2012), a short story in Belinda Frisch's Strandville zombie novel series  
 Payback: Debt and the Shadow Side of Wealth, a 2008 book by Margaret Atwood
 Payback, a 2007 novel by James Heneghan
 Payback: The Conspiracy to Destroy Michael Milken and his Financial Revolution, a 1995 book by Daniel Fischel

Music 
 Payback Records, an Australian record company

Albums
 Payback (album), a 2012 album by Danny!, or the title song
 The Payback, a 1974 album by James Brown, or the title song (see below)

Songs
 "Payback" (Flaw song), 2001
 "Payback" (Rascal Flatts song), 2014
 "The Payback" (song), by James Brown, 1973
 "Payback", by Bobby Sheen, 1973
 "Payback", by Juicy J, Kevin Gates, Future and Sage the Gemini from Furious 7: Original Motion Picture Soundtrack, 2015
 "Payback", by Montell Jordan from This Is How We Do It, 1995
 "Payback", by Quarashi from Guerilla Disco, 2004
 "Payback", by Slayer from God Hates Us All, 2001

Television

Series
 Payback (American TV series), a reality show on the SPEED Channel
 Payback (South Korean TV series), a 2023 television series
 WWE Payback, an annual professional wrestling pay-per-view event

Episodes
 "Payback" (Brandy & Mr. Whiskers)
 "Payback" (Brooklyn Nine-Nine)
 "Payback" (CSI: Miami)
 "Payback" (Law & Order: Special Victims Unit)
 "Payback" (Miami Vice)
 "Payback" (Third Watch)
 "Payback" (White Collar)
 "Payback", an episode of True Justice

Video games 
 Payback (video game), a 2001 game developed by Apex Designs
 Soldier of Fortune: Payback, the third installment in the Soldier of Fortune (SOF) series
 Need for Speed: Payback

Other uses 
 Payback period, the period of time required for the return on an investment
 Payback Press, a defunct specialist imprint of Canongate Books
 Operation Payback, an ongoing operation by the hacking group Anonymous

See also
Back Pay (disambiguation)